Vexillum burchorum is a species of sea snail, a marine gastropod mollusk, in the family Costellariidae, the ribbed miters.

Description
The length of the shell attains 28 mm.

Distribution
This marine species occurs off Hawaii

References

bouteti
Gastropods described in 2011